Oduduwa University was established in 2009, it is a private higher education institution located in Ipetumodu, Osun state. The university was officially accredited and recognized by the National Universities Commission of Nigeria as a higher education institution.  
Oduduwa University is located in Ipetumodu, Ile Ife, Osun State, Nigeria. It was named after Oduduwa, the progenitor of the Yoruba people.

Colleges 
The University is made up of four colleges:

College of Management and Social Sciences (CMSS) 
College of Management and Social Sciences (CMSS) consists of eight departments with only bachelor's degree programs are running.
 Business Administration
 Mass Communication & Media Technology
 Economics
 Banking & Finance
 Accounting
 Public Administration
 Political Science
 International Relations

College of Natural and Applied Sciences (CNAS) 
 Mathematics and Statistics
 Computer Science
 Physics (Electronics)
 Chemical Sciences (Industrial Chemistry, Chemistry, and Biochemistry)
 Biological Sciences (Microbiology/Pre-medicine)

College of Environmental Design and Management (CEDM) 
College of Environmental Design and Management (CEDM) which consists of three departments, but undergraduate programs
 Architecture
 Estate Management
 Quantity Surveying

College of Engineering and Technology (CET) 
 Computer Engineering
 Electronic/Electrical Engineering
 Mechanical Engineering

Centres 
The following centres that complement academic and research activities:
 Centre for Information and Communications Technology (CICT)
 Centre for Entrepreneurial and Vocational Training (CEV)
 Centre for Professional Studies (CPS)
 Centre for Cultural Studies (CCS)
 Centre for Foundation and Extra-moral Studies (CFES)
 Centre for International Studies/Exchange Programmes
 Centre for Communication and Leadership Training (CCL)

All undergraduate students of the University go through the Centre of Information and Communication Technology and Centre of Entrepreneurial and Vocational Training

References

External links 
Oduduwa University website<ref>

Educational institutions established in 2009
Universities and colleges in Nigeria
2009 establishments in Nigeria
Private universities and colleges in Nigeria